Kevin Séraphin (born 7 December 1989) is a French retired professional basketball player. Séraphin started his professional basketball career in Cholet Basket, and was drafted 17th overall in the 2010 NBA draft by the Chicago Bulls, but was later traded to the Washington Wizards.

Professional career

Cholet Basket (2007–2010)
In December 2007, Séraphin joined the Cholet Basket senior team for the first time after having played for their junior team since 2006. In August 2009, he signed a three-year contract extension with Cholet. In the 2009–10 season, he played 32 games, averaging 6.0 points and 4.2 rebounds per game as he went on to help Cholet win the 2009–10 Pro A championship. He also earned the 2010 Most Improved Player award.

Washington Wizards (2010–2015)

On 24 June 2010 Séraphin was selected with the 17th overall pick in the 2010 NBA draft by the Chicago Bulls. On 8 July 2010 he was traded, along with Kirk Hinrich and cash considerations, to the Washington Wizards in exchange for the rights to Vladimir Veremeenko. On 30 July 2010 he signed his rookie scale contract with the Wizards.

On 20 September 2011 Séraphin signed with Caja Laboral of Spain for the duration of the NBA lockout. In December 2011, he returned to the Wizards following the conclusion of the lockout.

On 30 June 2014 the Wizards tendered a $3.89 million qualifying offer to make Séraphin a restricted free agent. On 18 July 2014 he accepted the one-year, $3.89 million qualifying offer.

New York Knicks (2015–2016)
On 6 August 2015 Séraphin signed with the New York Knicks.

Indiana Pacers (2016–2017)
On 8 September 2016 Séraphin signed with the Indiana Pacers. On 31 July 2017 he was waived by the Pacers.

Barcelona (2017–2019)
On 4 August 2017 Séraphin signed a two-year deal with FC Barcelona Lassa of the Liga ACB. On 17 February 2019 he won 2019 Copa del Rey, recording six points and one rebound in a 94–93 win over Real Madrid.

On 24 October 2020 Séraphin announced he was retiring from professional basketball, citing a knee injury.

Career statistics

NBA

Regular season

|-
| style="text-align:left;"|
| style="text-align:left;"|Washington
| 58 || 1 || 10.9 || .449 ||  || .710 || 2.6 || .3 || .3 || .5 || 2.7
|-
| style="text-align:left;"|
| style="text-align:left;"|Washington
| 57 || 21 || 20.6 || .531 || .000 || .671 || 4.9 || .6 || .3 || 1.3 || 7.9
|-
| style="text-align:left;"|
| style="text-align:left;"|Washington
| 79 || 8 || 21.8 || .461 ||  || .693 || 4.4 || .7 || .3 || .7 || 9.1
|-
| style="text-align:left;"|
| style="text-align:left;"|Washington
| 53 || 1 || 10.9 || .505 ||  || .871 || 2.4 || .3 || .1 || .5 || 4.7
|-
| style="text-align:left;"|
| style="text-align:left;"|Washington
| 79 || 0 || 15.6 || .513 || .000 || .707 || 3.6 || .7 || .1 || .7 || 6.6
|-
| style="text-align:left;"|
| style="text-align:left;"|New York
| 48 || 0 || 11.0 || .410 || .000 || .826 || 2.6 || 1.0 || .2 || .8 || 3.9
|-
| style="text-align:left;"|
| style="text-align:left;"|Indiana
| 49 || 3 || 11.4 || .551 || .000 || .636 || 2.9 || .5 || .1 || .4 || 4.7
|- class="sortbottom"
| style="text-align:center;" colspan="2"|Career
| 423 || 34 || 15.2 || .489 || .000 || .715 || 3.5 || .6 || .2 || .7 || 5.9

Playoffs

|-
| style="text-align:left;"|2014
| style="text-align:left;"|Washington
| 4 || 0 || 1.5 || .000 ||  ||  || .5 || .0 || .0 || .0 || .0
|-
| style="text-align:left;"|2015
| style="text-align:left;"|Washington
| 6 || 0 || 12.0 || .484 ||  || .500 || 3.2 || .3 || .3 || .2 || 5.5
|-
| style="text-align:left;"|2017
| style="text-align:left;"|Indiana
| 4 || 0 || 14.8 || .462 ||  || .714 || 3.5 || 1.0 || .0 || .5 || 7.3
|- class="sortbottom"
| style="text-align:center;" colspan="2"|Career
| 14 || 0 || 9.8 || .450 ||  || .615 || 2.5 || .4 || .1 || .2 || 4.4

EuroLeague

|-
| style="text-align:left;"|2011–12
| style="text-align:left;"|Caja Laboral
| 7 || 5 || 19.2 || .551 ||  || .800 || 5.0 || .6 || .4 || 1.0 || 8.9 || 9.4
|-
| style="text-align:left;"|2017–18
| style="text-align:left;" rowspan="2"|FC Barcelona
| 15 ||  || 20.3 || .579 || .000 || .655 || 4.9 || .9 || .3 || .9 || 12.1 || 12.5
|-
| style="text-align:left;"|2018–19
| 27 ||  || 14.1 || .632 ||  || .786 || 3.6 || .5 || .2 || .4 || 8.3 || 7.7
|- class="sortbottom"
| style="text-align:center;" colspan="2"|Career
| 49 || 5 || 17.9 || .587 || .000 || .747 || 4.2 || .6 || .3 || .6 || 8.9 || 9.9

National team career
Séraphin was named to the All-Tournament team of the 2009 FIBA Europe Under-20 Championship, after helping France to win the silver medal. He was a member of the senior French national basketball team in 2011, where France reached the finals of the EuroBasket 2011, which they lost to Spain. He played for France at the 2012 Summer Olympics.

See also
 
 List of European basketball players in the United States

References

External links

 Kevin Séraphin at euroleague.net
 Kevin Séraphin at cholet-basket.com
 Kevin Séraphin at nba.com

1989 births
Living people
Basketball players at the 2012 Summer Olympics
Black French sportspeople
Chicago Bulls draft picks
Cholet Basket players
FC Barcelona Bàsquet players
French expatriate basketball people in Spain
French expatriate basketball people in the United States
French Guianan basketball players
French men's basketball players
French people of French Guianan descent
Indiana Pacers players
Liga ACB players
National Basketball Association players from France
New York Knicks players
Olympic basketball players of France
Sportspeople from Cayenne
Power forwards (basketball)
Saski Baskonia players
Washington Wizards players